Rare Essence is a Washington, D.C.-based go-go band formed in 1976. Rare Essence has been amongst the most prominent musicians of the D.C. music scene, producing numerous hit songs in the local D.C. market and several hits nationwide, including the charting hit "Work the Walls".

History

Beginnings
Rare Essence was started in 1976 after childhood friends Quentin "Footz" Davidson, Andre "Whiteboy" Johnson, Michael "Funky Ned" Neal and John Jones decided to form a band. After school, the band gathered in their basements to play Top 40 hits from such influential funk bands as Parliament-Funkadelic, Cameo, and Con Funk Shun in practice sessions.

Eventually the band took on more players and conformed to the go-go style and sound, which gained recognition in the mid-70s. Although the go-go beat had been originated by Chuck Brown, the characteristic four Congo style played by all subsequent bands was originated by Rare Essence.

Once the direction of the band was settled, Rare Essence along with Chuck Brown, Trouble Funk and Experience Unlimited formed the basis for the emerging go-go scene. By 1979 their ability to draw consistent local crowds was well established. As was the wide dispersal of bootleg tapes.

Many of the band's original members contributed to the D.C. style, one would go on to be one of the most dynamic and influential performers on the go scene. Anthony Harley "Lil Benny" was on the way home from his weekly trumpet lesson when he heard the sound of a band coming from a nearby apartment building. After a brief audition, in which he performed the introduction to Kool & the Gang's "Hollywood Swinging", he was asked to join on the spot. Soon after, the band called on the assistance of Quentin's mother, Annie Mack, who became the band's first manager.

Present formation
Today, the band consists of twelve musicians who play a range of instruments from the timbales to the bass guitar. They play up to six nights a week, travelling throughout the country.

Rare Essence accomplished noteworthy successful hits as "Body Moves", the hit albums Live at Breeze's Metro Club, and Live at Celebrity Hall. In 1991, Rare Essence was offered a record deal by hip-hop producer Sean Combs and Andre Harrell (founder of Uptown Records), which resulted with the production of the single "Lock-It", which was featured on the soundtrack to the 1991 film Strictly Business. The band's most successful single, "Work the Walls", was released in 1992 and reached #68 in the US Billboard R&B chart.

In 1999, Rare Essence had some controversy regarding their song "Overnight Scenario", which was allegedly copied by Jay-Z in the song "Do It Again (Put Ya Hands Up)" and was the first single from his album, Vol. 3... Life and Times of S. Carter. There is an hour to hour account in the song "Overnight Scenario", and "Do It Again" follows the same concept. For example, Rare Essence's line was “Three in the Morning the Pancake House” while Jay-Z said “4 AM at the Waffle House”. The question was whether or not the problem should be called plagiarism or just similar concept. The group had been performing the song for most of the late 1990s and was concerned about the copyright infringement that seemingly took place. Jay–Z's defense was that go–go music is just remakes of other artists’ songs.

In 2009, Rare Essence performed at one of the inaugural balls. In 2012, the group collaborated with the Soul Rebels Brass Band during a Tribute to Chuck Brown on June 21, 2012 in Washington, D.C. at the historic Howard Theatre which is re-opened in April 2012.  Slick Rick was also on the tribute show.

In 2018, Rare Essence collaborated with Ethiopian American singer Kelela, contributing a remix of her song "Take Me Apart" to her album Take Me a_Part, the Remixes.

Past members
Former drummer Quentin "Footz" Davidson was murdered on September 17, 1994 at the age of 33. Former band member Anthony Harley (Little Benny) died on May 30, 2010 in Washington, D.C. at the age of 46. Byron "B.J." Jackson died of cancer on September 4, 2016 at the age of 52. Former saxophonist Rory "DC" Felton was murdered on April 21, 2018 at the age of 57.

Discography

Studio albums
 Work the Walls (1992)
 So What You Want? (1995)
 Let's Go Go Christmas (1995)
 Body Snatchers  (1996)
 We Go On and On (1998)
 RE-2000 (1999)
 Turn It Up (2016)

Mixtape albums
 Mixtape, Vol. 1, Hosted by DJ Dirty Rico (2012)
 Mixtape, Vol. 2, Hosted by DJ Dirty Rico (2013)

Live albums
 Live at Breeze's Metro Club (1986)
 Go Go Live at the Capital Centre (1987)
 Live at Celebrity Hall / Live at the Metro Club (1987)
 Get Your Freak On (1995)
 Doin' It Old School Live at Club U (2001)
 Live PA #4 (Back at The Classics) (2002)
 Live at Club U, vol. 2 (featuring Doug E. Fresh & the Get Fresh Crew) (2003)
 Live in 2004 (2004)
 Live PA #6 Back at the Tradewinds (2004)
 Live PA #9 Live @ the Tradewinds (2007)
 Live PA #11 Live @ the Zanzibar (2009)
 Live PA #12 Live @ the D.C. Star (2010)
 Live PA #14 Live @ the Tradewinds (2011)
 Live PA #16 Live @ the Tradewinds (2013)
 The Reunion (Live at the Hyatt Regency) (2015)

Compilation albums
Greatest Hits, Vol. 1 (1995)

Singles
 "Body Moves" (1981)
 "Back Up Against the Wall" (1983)
 "Shoo-Be-Do-Wop" (1984)
 "Give It Here" (1986)
 "Flipside" (1986)
 "Hey Now" (1988)
 "Lock It" (1991)
 "Work The Walls" (1992)
 "Must Be Like That" (1993)
 "Brothers / Comeback" (1993)
 "So What U Want?" (1994)
 "No Bang No More " (1996)
 "Body Snatchers" (1996)
 "Player Hater" (1997)
 "We Push" (featuring Redman) (1999)
 "Pieces of Me" (2004)
 "Turn It Up" (2016)

References

External links
 
Rare Essence at Allmusic.com

1976 establishments in Washington, D.C.
African-American musical groups
American funk musical groups
American dance music groups
Go-go musical groups
Musical groups established in 1976
Musical groups from Washington, D.C.